Lycée Jean-Vilar  is a senior high school/sixth form college in Plaisir, Yvelines, France, in the Paris metropolitan area.

 there are 754 students; 720 of them lived in Plaisir.

References

External links
 Lycée Jean-Vilar 

Lycées in Yvelines
Schools in Saint-Quentin-en-Yvelines